Boatman or boatmen may refer to:

 Boatman (surname)
 Boatman, Oklahoma
 Boatman, Queensland, a locality in the Shire of Murweh
 Boatmen's Bancshares
 Lesser water boatman, a water-dwelling insect
 Water boatman (disambiguation), various species of insect
 Toronto Argonauts, a Canadian football team known colloquially as "The Boatmen"